The LXIII Legislature of the Mexican Congress is made up of senators and deputies that are members of their respective chambers. It convened on September 1, 2015 and concluded on August 31, 2018.

Senators were elected to office in the 2012 election for a period of six years and therefore exercised their position also in the previous legislature; the deputies, elected in the electoral process of 2015, will hold office only in the current legislature.

Legislation

Constitutional Reforms

New Laws

Senate of the Republic 
The formation of the LXIII legislature is as follows:

Members of the Senate are elected for a period of six years, three for each of the states and the Federal District, and 32 more for a national list, giving a total of 128 Senators.

Number of senators by political party 
For the internal government of the Senate, senators are grouped by political party for which they were elected in parliamentary groups, each of which is headed by a coordinator. The coordinators of all groups in turn form the Board of Policy Coordination of the Senate.

The 128 Senators who make up the LXII Legislature are:

Senators by federative entity

Senators by national list

Presidents of the Senate in the LXIII Legislature

Parliamentary coordinators 
 National Action Party:
 (2015 – ): Fernando Herrera Ávila
  Institutional Revolutionary Party:
 Emilio Gamboa Pattern
  Party of the Democratic Revolution:
 Miguel Barbosa Huerta
  Ecologist Green Party of Mexico:
 Jorge Emilio González Martínez
 Labor Party:
 Manuel Bartlett Díaz

Chamber of Deputies 

The Chamber of Deputies is composed of 500 elected legislators for a period of 3 years and nonreeligible for the immediate period . 300 deputies are elected by direct vote for each one of the Electoral Districts of the country, and the other 200 by a system voted in each of the Constituencies lists.

The composition of the Chamber of Deputies in the Legislature LXIII is as follows :

Number of deputies by political party

Deputies by single-member district (relative majority)

Deputies by proportional representation

Presidents of the Chamber of Deputies 
 (2015-2016): Jesús Zambrano Grijalva
 (2016-2017): Javier Bolaños Aguilar
 (2017-): Jorge Carlos Ramírez Marín

Parliamentary coordinators 
 National Action Party:
 Marko Cortés Mendoza
  Institutional Revolutionary Party:
 César Camacho Quiroz
  Party of the Democratic Revolution:
 Francisco Martínez Neri
  Ecologist Green Party of Mexico:
 Jesús Sesma Suárez
  Citizen's Movement:
 Clemente Castañeda Hoeflich
  New Alliance:
 Alfredo Valles Mendoza
  National Regeneration Movement:
 Rocío Nahle García
  Social Encounter Party
 Alejandro González Murillo

See also 
 Senate of Mexico
 Chamber of Deputies of Mexico
 Politics of Mexico

References

External links 
 Official page of the Camera of Deputies
 Official page of the Senate

Congress of Mexico by session
2015 in Mexico